Charles or Charlie Barton may refer to:
Charles Barton (British Army officer) (1760–1819), Lieutenant-General
Charles Barton (legal writer) (1768–1843), English legal writer
Charles Barton (Queensland politician) (1829–1902)
Charles Barton (New South Wales politician) (1848–1912)
Charles Barton (New Zealand politician) (1852–1935), New Zealand farmer, businessman and mayor
Charles Barton (cricketer) (1860–1919), English cricketer
Charles K. Barton (1886–1958), member of the New Jersey Senate
Charles Barton (director) (1902–1981), American actor and director
Charlie Barton (journalist) (1919/1920–1972), Canadian sports journalist
Charles Barton (basketball), player in 2011 FIBA Europe Under-20 Championship
Charlie Barton, a character in The Howling